Michael Władysław Klukowski (born 27 May 1981) is a Canadian soccer player who played as a left-back. He made 36 appearances for the Canada national team.

Club career
Klukowski was born in Amstetten, Austria. He began his career in Canada playing for the Oshawa Kicks and Scarborough Azzurri-Blues, before travelling across the Atlantic to link up with Dijon FCO in 1999. A move to Tourcoing FC followed the next year before his performances caught the attentions of Ligue 1 outfit Lille OSC whom he joined in 2001. He only played for their reserves team however so his time at the Stade Grimonprez-Jooris was equally fleeting though but he finally found his feet at La Louvière, making 72 league appearances over the next two-and-a-half seasons and growing in stature. While at La Louvière he helped them win the 2002–03 Belgian Cup.

Club Brugge
At La Louvière, Klukowski attracted interest from Club Brugge who signed him in a deal thought to be worth €900,000 during the winter break in January 2005. He initially had to bide his time at the Jan Breydel Stadium but did make six appearances towards the end of the campaign as Club Brugge sealed the title. Klukowski was the number one left back for five seasons with Brugge. He replaced Peter Van Der Heyden, who suffered a knee injury, during the last season with Trond Sollied. Klukowski left Brugge with 178 official games including 26 European appearances and two Belgian Supercup Final appearances.

Ankaragücü
In mid-August 2010 Klukowski moved to Süper Lig club Ankaragücü for an estimated value of €750,000 while signing a three-year deal. He made his debut for the club in a 1–1 home draw against Kayserispor on 27 August 2010. Klukowski scored his first goal in Turkey on 4 December 2010 in a 1–1 home draw against Sivasspor, scoring the opening goal in the 11th minute at the Ankara 19 Mayıs Stadium until Erman Kılıç tied it up with a goal in the 56th. In early April 2011 it was announced that Klukowski was leaving Ankaragücü over unpaid wages. The club was in the news earlier that year when former England international Darius Vassell was kicked out of his hotel room because the club failed to pay for his accommodation. In April 2011 Klukowski sued Ankaragücü for unpaid wages and compensation for the two years left on his contract for the amount of €1.5 million. In July 2013 Klukowski won his case and Ankaragucu were forced to pay him €800,000.

Manisaspor
In early June prior to the 2011 CONCACAF Gold Cup it was announced that Klukowski had signed for Manisaspor for the upcoming season. Canadian international Josh Simpson Manisaspor's leading goal scorer from the 2010–11 season played a major factor in Klukowski's decision to sign with the Western Turkish club. Klukowski made his debut for Manisaspor on 10 September in a 1–1 draw against Trabzonspor.

APOEL
On 20 July 2012, Klukowski signed a two-year contract with Cypriot side APOEL. At the end of the season he was crowned champion after winning the 2012–13 Cypriot First Division with APOEL. On 12 August 2013, APOEL unilaterally terminated Klukowski's contract because of serious breaches of discipline and breaches of contract and internal regulations of the club by the player.

After the termination of his contract he took APOEL to court at FIFA. On 20 June 2015, he won his court case and APOEL were forced to pay him over €200,000 in compensation.

International career
After representing Canada at the 2001 FIFA World Youth Championship in Argentina, Klukowski made the step up to the senior side in March 2003. He made his debut for Canada in a February 2003 friendly match against Libya. He has represented Canada in ten FIFA World Cup qualification matches. As of 13 June 2012, he has earned a total of 36 caps, scoring no goals.

He managed to make the All-Tournament team of the 2009 CONCACAF Gold Cup along with fellow Canadian Julian de Guzman.

Personal life
Born to Polish parents who had stopped in Austria while on their way to Canada, Klukowski is of Polish descent and holds Polish citizenship.

Honours
La Louvière
Belgian Cup: 2002–03

Club Brugge
Belgian Super Cup: 2005
Belgian Cup: 2006–07

Canada
CONCACAF Gold Cup All-Tournament Team: 2009

References

External links
 APOEL official profile
  (archive)
 
 Guardian Football
 

1981 births
Living people
Association football defenders
Canadian soccer players
Canada men's international soccer players
2009 CONCACAF Gold Cup players
2011 CONCACAF Gold Cup players
Canadian expatriate soccer players
Expatriate footballers in France
Canadian expatriate sportspeople in France
Expatriate footballers in Belgium
Canadian expatriate sportspeople in Belgium
Dijon FCO players
Lille OSC players
R.A.A. Louviéroise players
Club Brugge KV players
Manisaspor footballers
APOEL FC players
Belgian Pro League players
Expatriate footballers in Turkey
Expatriate footballers in Cyprus
Süper Lig players
Cypriot First Division players
Canadian people of Polish descent
Austrian people of Polish descent
People from Amstetten, Lower Austria
Canada men's youth international soccer players
US Tourcoing FC players